Rukn-ud-Daula lake or Rukunu Dowla Lake is a historic lake situated in Shivarampally village near Hyderabad, India.

History
The lake was constructed in 1770 by Nawab Rukn-ud-Daula - the Prime Minister of Sikandar Jah - the 3rd Nizam of Hyderabad. Reputedly originally 104 acres, the lake has been subject of controversy over claims of encroachment.

Current Status 
The lake has been encroached by land-grabbers.

References

Hyderabad State
Lakes of Hyderabad, India
Artificial lakes of India
People from Hyderabad State